Hubert Hurkacz defeated Jannik Sinner in the final, 7–6(7–4), 6–4 to win the men's singles tennis title at the 2021 Miami Open. Hurkacz claimed his first Masters 1000 singles championship and became the first Pole to win a Masters 1000 singles title.

Roger Federer was the reigning champion from when the tournament was last held in 2019, but chose not to participate this year.

As both Novak Djokovic and Rafael Nadal also chose not to participate, this was the first Masters 1000 tournament since the 2004 Paris Masters without at least one member of the Big Three competing.

Seeds
All seeds received a bye into the second round.

Draw

Finals

Top half

Section 1

Section 2

Section 3

Section 4

Bottom half

Section 5

Section 6

Section 7

Section 8

Qualifying

Seeds

Qualifiers

Lucky losers

Qualifying draw

First qualifier

Second qualifier

Third qualifier

Fourth qualifier

Fifth qualifier

Sixth qualifier

Seventh qualifier

Eighth qualifier

Ninth qualifier

Tenth qualifier

Eleventh qualifier

Twelfth qualifier

References

External links
 Main draw
 Qualifying draw

Men's Singles
Men in Florida